Nanong Gewog (Dzongkha: ན་ནོང་) is a gewog (village block) of Pemagatshel District, Bhutan.

Nanong Gewog (county) has 55 villages and 526 households with 2351 population. It has an area of 81.04 square kilometers. The gewog has moderate cold temperate climate. The dry land cultivation dominates agriculture land use and paddy cultivation is minimal. Maize is the main cereals and potato, orange, ginger and sugarcane are grown for cash income. Its potential exist for horticulture development in ginger, sugarcane, groundnut, orange and cereal crops like mustard, millet, buckwheat and maize. The establishment of piggery and poultry farms is also possible. 

The gewog is popular for satshoen (soil paints) for traditional painting and Tshatshi-buram (Bhutanese Sweet made from sugarcane juice). These two products are unique to this place. The constraints faced are remoteness from road (roads are under construction from two points into the gewog from two point to make a ring road), lack of access to market, lack of water irrigation, crop damage by wild animals and farm labour shortage. The gewog has two BHU, RNR centre and three CPS. In the 10th FYP there is a proposal to establish one ECR and construct a new MSS at Lhungkhar in Yelchen.

Potentials
Nanong Gewog falls under Nanong-Shumar constituency and its member to the parliament (MP) is the Prime Minister of Bhutan. H.E. Lyenpo Jigme Thinley is the first democratically elected Prime Minister of Bhutan. He hails from Druk Phunsum Tshogpa (DPT) party.

Villages
 

Tshatshe

References

External links
 Pemagatshel website (non-functional; Wayback Machine archive here)
 https://web.archive.org/web/20100303092038/http://www.pemagatshel.gov.bt/gewogDetail.php?id=38

Gewogs of Bhutan
Pemagatshel District